Ectoedemia variicapitella is a moth of the family Nepticulidae. It is endemic to the Canary Islands.

The larvae feed on Hypericum canariense. They mine the leaves of their host plant. The mine consists of a narrow corridor at first, gradually widening and ending in a blotch. Pupation takes place outside of the mine.

External links
Fauna Europaea
bladmineerders.nl

Nepticulidae
Moths of Africa
Moths described in 1908